Jelšovce is a village and municipality in the Nitra District in western central Slovakia, in the Nitra Region.

History
In historical records the village was first mentioned in 1326.

Geography
The village lies at an altitude of 146 metres and covers an area of 10.442 km2. It has a population of about 950 people.

Ethnicity
The village is approximately 88% Slovak, 11% Magyar and 1% Gypsy.

Facilities
The village has a public library a gym and football pitch.

See also
 List of municipalities and towns in Slovakia

References

Genealogical resources

The records for genealogical research are available at the state archive "Statny Archiv in Nitra, Slovakia"

 Roman Catholic church records (births/marriages/deaths): 1747-1913 (parish A)

External links
https://web.archive.org/web/20071217080336/http://www.statistics.sk/mosmis/eng/run.html
Surnames of living people in Jelsovce

Villages and municipalities in Nitra District